Samoana decussatula, common name the "Polynesian tree snail", is a species of tropical, air-breathing land snail, a terrestrial, pulmonate, gastropod mollusk in the family Partulidae. This species is endemic to Hiva Oa, Marquesas Islands, French Polynesia. It has also been recorded from the neighbouring island of Tahuata, but its presence there has not been confirmed.

References

External links

D
Fauna of French Polynesia
Molluscs of Oceania
Critically endangered fauna of Oceania